is a Japanese manga series written and illustrated by Sōichirō Yamamoto. The series originally began as a webcomic titled Shōgi no Yatsu, which was published in 2018. The manga has been serialized in Kodansha's Weekly Shōnen Magazine since March 2019. An anime television series adaptation by Silver Link aired from July to September 2022.

Synopsis
Ayumu Tanaka, a first-year high school student, and Urushi Yaotome, a second-year student, are members of the shogi club. Ayumu vows to confess his feelings to Urushi, his senpai, after he manages to defeat her in a game of shogi, but he is a beginner at the game and Urushi always beats him. Meanwhile, Urushi keeps trying to get Ayumu to admit that he likes her, but Ayumu never allows his poker face to slip.

Characters

A first-year high school student, Ayumu is a member of the shogi club. In love with Urushi Yaotome, he has vowed that he will not confess his feelings until he beats her at shogi. However, the relationship between the two has not progressed because he has never won. When he was a middle school student, he belonged to the kendo club, and his tactics to break through his opponent's defense were excellent, so his reputation in the club was high. Even in shogi, his defense tactics have become more prominent, but Urushi continues to read his moves.

A second-year student, Urushi is Ayumu's senpai in the shogi club. Although Urushi herself claims to be the president of the shogi club, it is not recognized as an official club because there are not enough members. While Urushi believes that Ayumu likes her, she has yet to get him to admit it.

Takeru is a first-year student who is one of Ayumu's childhood friends. Like Ayumu he was also proficient in kendo. A member of the library committee, he has a crush on Sakurako.

Sakurako is a first-year student who is one of Ayumu's childhood friends. A member of the library committee, she is a shy girl who likes to hypnotize Takeru and is unaware that he has a crush on her.

Rin is a student who was Ayumu and Takeru's junior in their middle school kendo club. She later attends the same high school as them when they become second-years.

Maki is a second-year student who is Urushi's best friend. She like to tease Urushi concerning Ayumu and is a fan of their relationship.

Media

Manga
When Will Ayumu Make His Move? is written and illustrated by Sōichirō Yamamoto. The series originally began as a webcomic titled , which Yamamoto posted on his Twitter account from April 22 to November 19, 2018. When Will Ayumu Make His Move? started in Kodansha's Weekly Shōnen Magazine on March 6, 2019. Kodansha has compiled its chapters into individual tankōbon volumes. The first volume was published on July 4, 2019. As of March 16, 2023, fourteen volumes have been released.

In March 2021, Kodansha USA announced that they licensed the manga for English release in North America.

Volume list

Anime
An anime television series adaptation was announced on January 8, 2021. The series was animated by Silver Link and directed by Mirai Minato, with Deko Akao overseeing the series' scripts, and Kazuya Hirata designing the characters. It aired from July 8 to September 23, 2022, on TBS and BS-TBS. Sentai Filmworks has licensed the series.

Episode list

Reception
In 2020, the manga was nominated for the 6th Next Manga Awards and placed 3rd out of the 50 nominees with 19,182 votes.

Notes

References

External links
 
 

2018 webcomic debuts
2018 webcomic endings
2022 anime television series debuts
Anime series based on manga
Japanese webcomics
Kodansha manga
Romantic comedy anime and manga
School life in anime and manga
Sentai Filmworks
Shogi in anime and manga
Shōnen manga
Silver Link
Slice of life anime and manga
TBS Television (Japan) original programming